"" (English: West Prussia Song) was the anthem of the Prussian province of West Prussia from 1878 to its dissolution in 1920.

Lyrics

German Empire
Prussia
German anthems
German-language songs